Liu Hongwang (born 13 February 1962) is a Chinese biathlete. He competed in the 20 km individual event at the 1984 Winter Olympics.

References

External links
 

1962 births
Living people
Chinese male biathletes
Olympic biathletes of China
Biathletes at the 1984 Winter Olympics
Place of birth missing (living people)
Asian Games medalists in biathlon
Biathletes at the 1986 Asian Winter Games
Asian Games bronze medalists for China
Asian Games silver medalists for China
Medalists at the 1986 Asian Winter Games